The 1884 Toledo Blue Stockings finished with a 45–58 record, eighth place in the American Association. This was the only season the team was in a major league.

The team was noteworthy for catcher Fleet Walker and outfielder Weldy Walker, two brothers who are credited as being the first and second African Americans to play Major League Baseball before the color barrier prevented blacks from playing in the majors again until 1947.

Regular season

Season standings

Record vs. opponents

Roster

Player stats

Batting

Starters by position 
Note: Pos = Position; G = Games played; AB = At bats; H = Hits; Avg. = Batting average; HR = Home runs

Other batters 
Note: G = Games played; AB = At bats; H = Hits; Avg. = Batting average; HR = Home runs

Pitching

Starting pitchers 
Note: G = Games pitched; IP = Innings pitched; W = Wins; L = Losses; ERA = Earned run average; SO = Strikeouts

Other pitchers 
Note: G = Games pitched; IP = Innings pitched; W = Wins; L = Losses; ERA = Earned run average; SO = Strikeouts

Relief pitchers 
Note: G = Games pitched; W = Wins; L = Losses; SV = Saves; ERA = Earned run average; SO = Strikeouts

References 
 1884 Toledo Blue Stockings team page at Baseball Reference

Toledo Blue Stockings season